Elmer Donald "Pep" Rambert (August 1, 1916 – November 16, 1974) was a pitcher in Major League Baseball (MLB). He played for the Pittsburgh Pirates.

Rambert's only decision came on the final day of his MLB career when he surrendered 8 runs in a 3–11 loss to the Cincinnati Reds at Crosley Field.

In the minor leagues, he played both pitcher and outfielder, beginning with the Leesburg Gondoliers and St. Augustine Saints of the Florida State League in 1937.  During the latter part of his minor league career he was a player manager for the Cairo Egyptians (1946), Federalsburg A's (1947), Hagerstown Owls (1948), Eastman Dodgers (1951), and Cocoa Indians (1952).

References

External links

1916 births
1974 deaths
Major League Baseball pitchers
Hagerstown Owls players
Pittsburgh Pirates players
Minor league baseball managers
Baseball players from Cleveland
Nashville Vols players
Federalsburg A's players